Çayan can refer to:

 Çayan, Göynücek, a village in Amasya Province, Turkey
 Çayan, Sungurlu, a village in Çorum Province, Turkey
 Mahir Çayan (1946–1972), Turkish Communist leader

See also
 Cayan
 Çayönü
 Chayan (disambiguation)